Fugata Quintet is a London based chamber group formed in early 2007 at the Royal Academy of Music, where all quintet members were studying at the time. Fugata principally perform Nuevo Tango music by the Argentine composer Ástor Piazzolla. The quintet is one of the few independent groups to have produced and performed a fully staged production of Maria de Buenos Aires, the Tango Operita by Ástor Piazzolla and Horacio Ferrer. The group's name is an homage to Piazzolla's composition Fugata from the Nuevo Tango Suite Tangata Silfo y Ondina.  The current quintet members are: Živorad Nikolić (accordion), Anastasios Mavroudis (violin), Antonis Hatzinikolaou (electric guitar), Anahit Chaushyan (piano), James Opstad (double bass).

References
Bennett, Bruce. "THE SOCIETY OF COMPOSERS, INC. NEWSLETTER XXXIII:5", SCI Newsletter, New Orleans, September, 2003.
Hogwood, Ben. "Classical Music :: The Classical Source :: Park Lane Group Young Artists New Year Series 2008 – 4", classicalsource.com, London, January 10, 2008.
Kingston, Peter. "Winning notes', The Guardian, London, July 2, 2002.
 "Music | London Evening Standard', this is london, the entertainment guide, London, February 12, 2008.
"RPS Young Artist Biography", Royal Philharmonic Society, London, 2007.
Simek, Peter. "This Week: Soviet Pride, A Comic Lover, and Undiscovered Spanish Composers", D Magazine, Dallas, February 16, 2010.
Wassily Saba, Thérèse.  "Music Review", Classical Guitar Magazine, London, January 23, 2009.

External links
 Official website
 Maria de Buenos AIres website
 Fugata's YouTube Channel
 Fugata on Vimeo

Tango music groups
Chamber music groups
Musical quintets
Musical groups from London